Shaianna Rincon (born August 21, 1993) is an American mixed martial artist who last competed in the featherweight division of the Invicta Fighting Championships.

Mixed martial arts career

Invicta Fighting Championships 

Rincon made her Invicta debut on March 28, 2018, against Brooksie Bayard on May 17, 2017, at Invicta FC 23: Porto vs. Niedźwiedź. She won the fight via unanimous decision.

Her next fight came on August 31, 2017, facing Courtney King, replacing Stephanie Egger, at Invicta FC 25: Kunitskaya vs. Pa'aluhi. She won the fight via technical knockout in round two.

On November 1, 2019, Rincon faced Auttumn Norton at Invicta FC 38: Murata vs. Ducote. She lost the fight unanimous decision.

Mixed martial arts record 

|-
| Loss
| align=center| 2–1
| Auttumn Norton
| Decision (unanimous)
| Invicta FC 38: Murata vs. Ducote
| 
| align=center| 3
| align=center| 5:00
| Kansas City, Kansas, United States
|
|-
| Win
| align=center|  2–0
| Courtney King
| TKO (punches)
| Invicta FC 25: Kunitskaya vs. Pa'aluhi
| 
| align=center| 2
| align=center| 3:41
| Kansas City, Kansas, United States
|
|-
| Win
| align=center|  1–0
| Brooksie Bayard
| Decision (unanimous)
| Invicta FC 23: Porto vs. Niedźwiedź
| 
| align=center| 3
| align=center| 5:00
| Kansas City, Missouri, United States
|
|-

See also 
 List of current Invicta FC fighters

References

External links
 Yaya Rincon at Invicta FC
 

1993 births
Living people
American female mixed martial artists
Mixed martial artists from California
People from Vacaville, California
21st-century American women